Sakhalin grasshopper warbler (Helopsaltes amnicola), is a species of grass warbler in the family Locustellidae; it was formerly included in the "Old World warbler" assemblage.

Distribution and habitat
This small passerine bird breeds on Sakhalin, the southern Kuril Islands and Hokkaido. It  is a species found in lowland and coastal regions, nesting in forests or thickets.

Description
This is the largest of all the Locustella warblers, approaching the size of the great reed warbler. The adult has an unstreaked olive-brown back, uniformly grey breast and buff underparts, with unmottled dull orange undertail coverts.

The song is a short phrase, loud and distinctive; nothing like the insect-like reeling of European Locustella species, and more musical than that of Pallas's grasshopper warbler.

References

Helopsaltes
Birds described in 1972
Birds of Japan